James Lind FRS FRSE FRCPE (1736–1812) was a Scottish natural philosopher and physician.

Life
James Lind was born in Gorgie, Edinburgh on 17 May 1736.

He studied medicine at Edinburgh University under William Cullen and Joseph Black, and graduated in 1768. In 1766, he then joined the East India Company as surgeon. In 1768 he received his doctorate (MD) from Edinburgh upon completing a dissertation on marsh fever (malaria) in Bengal. On 6 November 1770 he was admitted a Fellow of the College of Physicians, Edinburgh. In 1773 he was a founding member of the Aesculapian Club. Lind was also a corresponding member of the Lunar Society.

Personality 
Lind is widely regarded as having an eccentric personality, and considered to be reckless with spending money as captured by the following dialogue: "Why, Dr. Lind, you spend a whole seas of gold", to which Lind replied, "Madam, 'tis true, my very name, behold, Begins with pounds and ends, alas, with pence"

Charles Burney described Lind as extremely thin, tall, with grey hair as seen around age 70 ('a mere lath'). Lind was generally acknowledged to have a sweet disposition, and Fanny Burney cast doubt whether he obtained much of a private medical practice: "his taste for trickes, conundrums and queer things makes people fearful of his trying experiments on their constitutions, and think of him a better conjuror than a physician; though I don't know why the same man should not be both".

Percy Shelley said Lind to be, "...exactly what an old man ought to be. Free, calm-spirited, full of benevolence, and even of youthful ardor: his eye seemed to burn with supernatural spirit beneath his brow, shaded by his venerable white locks, he was tall, vigorous, and healthy in his body; tempered, as it had ever been, by his amiable mind. I owe to that man far, ah! far more than I owe to my father: he loved me, and I shall never forget our long talks, where he breathed the spirit of the kindest tolerance and the purest wisdom,"

In A Sketch of My Life, Lind's son Alexander Frances Lind wrote: "Would that my feeble pen could render better justice to my father's memory; and would that I had been older to have profited by the instructions he was so peculiarly fitted to afford. I have been told, and I believe it, that few men existed of more universal knowledge; and that very few could be met, whose conversation was do instructive, and whose life and manners were more gently, and unassuming."

Family 
James Lind was the son of Alexander Lind of Gorgie, FRSE, (who was the son of George Lind of Gorgie, Sheriff Deputy of Edinburgh, and Jean Montgomery of Smithton) Lind's great-grandfather was John Lind IV (who was the son of Mary Boyd of Pittfinde). John Lind IV and Isabel had five children. Their other notable descendants included James Keir, and George Lind (who was Lord Provost of Edinburgh, and Member of Parliament for Edinburgh), and Colonel John Lind, and Major-General John Lind (1733 - 1795), and Anne Lind (who was the wife of Richard Cooper), and the distinguished physician James Lind of Haslar (1716 – 1794) (who is the namesake of the James Lind Alliance), and Sir James Lind, and John Lind (barrister), and Sir James Grant.

The surname Lind, of which the motto was Semper Virescit Virtus, is derived from Lynne of Ayrshire in Scotland. Synonymous variations include Lynne, Linn and Lind used by free Barons from the earliest of recorded history. There were Linns of that Ilk in Ayrshire, and Linns of Pitmade in Perthshire. James Lind is descended from the Linds of Ayrshire. King John Balliol mentions William de Lynne of that Ilk in a donation, who is a direct forefather in the Lind lineage. Lind's mother, Helen Allardice (1697 - 1746) was daughter of Sir George Allardice, Member of Parliament and Master of the Mint of Scotland, through whom James Lind was 10th in descent from James II of Scotland.

Lind married Ann Elizabeth Mealy on 07 Nov 1778. She is mentioned in Burney's Diary, she mentioned his wife as "a fat handsome wife who is as tall as himself and about six times as big". Charlotte Papendiek referred to her as "needlewoman and everything to the Duchess of Portland at Bulstrode". Mealy was daughter of John Mealy of Middlesex and Elizabeth Parry of Perveddgoed. whose pedigree included lineage from David Daron who was the Dean of Bangor in 1399. Ann died at the age of 48 from an apoplectic fit. Lind had at least four children by Ann Elizabeth Mealy: Their notable children included: Lucy Maria Lind (1783-1858), later Sherwill, who profiled Princess Amelia of the United Kingdom; Dorothea Sophia Banks Lind (1786 - 1863), who married Isaac Gosset (1782 – 1855), and whose daughter Helen Dorothea or Dorothy Gosset married William Driscoll Gosset; Alexander Francis Lind (1797 - 1832), who was a civil servant for Lord Ailesbury and for Queen Charlotte, and who was Judge of Mirzapur, and who married Anna Maria Macan (1802 - 1862) who was the daughter of Robert Macan High Sheriff of Armagh in 1814.

Mary Shelley's Frankenstein 
Lind taught at Eton College while in semi-retirement. Around 1809, he tutored Percy Bysshe Shelley, husband of Mary Shelley. Percy alluded to Lind in two poems from 1817, the old man who rescues Laon in The Revolt of Islam, and Prince Athanase, where he appears as the wise old teacher magus Zonoras.

Percy was fascinated with Lind's experiments and demonstrations of galvanism (e.g. using electricity to animate the muscles of dead frogs causing them to jump, or causing the jerking of reptile muscles), hence Lind has been suggested to have been an inspirational origin of Mary Shelley's Frankenstein. Specifically, it is thought Mary Wollstonecraft Shelley had a nightmare while staying with Percy Shelley at Byron's House in Lake Geneva due to Percy reminiscing about Lind's bizarre experiments. Lind is also thought to be the source for the character of the blind old man, De Lacey, as well as Doctor M. Waldman in the novel Frankenstein.

Lind is also thought to be a trace influential origin of Dracula.

Freemasonry 
Lind was involved in freemasonry in Scotland. He was initiated in the Canongate Kilwinning, Lodge No. 2, on 2 August 1758. He was also active in the Grand Lodge of Scotland, of which he was Senior Grand Warden between 1769 – 1771.

Death 
Late in life, a portrait of Lind was painted by John Keenan in 1807.

Lind died at the house of his son-in-law, William Burnie, in Russell Square, London, on 17 October 1812. Alexander Francis Lind indicated the cause of death was, "of a suppression of urine, which for nearly five years before his death kept him in ceaseless agony". He is buried in at St George's Church on Bloomsbury Way, London in the crypt, coffin 6084.

Career 
In addition to medicine, Lind was interested in a variety of sciences (botany, astronomy, meteorology, geology, chemistry, etc.), collected antiques and drawings, and was a silhouette artist and played the bassoon and flute. He was an expert in Pliny and Lucretius. 

As a member of the  Society, Lind was closely acquainted with many prominent scientists of his era exemplified by James Watt. Watt confided in Lind in discussing his steam engine, and in Watt's publication, Description of a New Perspective Machine, he opens by referring to Lind: "The perspective machine was invented about 1765, in consequence of my friend Dr. James Lind having brought from India a machine [...] invented by Mr. Hurst."

Career highlights

Astronomy and Naval Voyages 
In astronomy, Lind utilized a telescope to observe the transit of Venus from Hawkhill and reported his account to the Royal Society in 1769, and printed with remarks from Nevil Maskelyne. Lord Alemore had built Lind an observatory at his house in Hawkhill for this purpose (as noted in a letter from Lord Loudoun) also known as "the observatory of Hawk-hill westward". Lind likewise observed an eclipse of the moon at the same location, the account of which was likewise read to the Royal Society. Lind kept up a correspondence with Patrick Wilson about William Herschel's astronomical works. Lind also traveled with Caroline Herschel to view a comet in Slough. Like William Herschel, Lind believed in cosmic pluralism and recently has been suggested to have observed a UFO at Windsor.

Lind's wife, Ann Elizabeth Mealy, was suggested to have been the first to observed volcanic activity on the moon despite Herschel receiving credit for the observation. The red flashes they observed were later determined to not be volcanic.

As a naturalist, Lind collected plant specimens during voyages aboard Drake (1762-1763) and Hampshire (1765-1767) with significant collections made at the Cape and the Comoros en route to India and south-east Asia. Lind visited: 

 China in 1766 (having brought back a specimen of lemon grass that was sampled in tea), later in 1789 Lind also visited Soho Square to draft an important spreadsheet that cross-referenced Chinese plants from Chinese texts and Latin texts (Lind also spoke Chinese, in addition to his knowledge of Latin previously used to write his dissertation) which enabled botanists to place accurate orders of exotic flora. Lind also contributed to Fanny Burney's efforts to develop a chapter on Chinese music in the fifth volume of the History of Music. Lind's witty sarcasm is showcased as he told Pieter Camper "the Chinese do not wish to bring up their children, but drown them in the river". Lind was later requested to join the Macartney Embassy in China in 1792 but Lind declined. 
 Iceland in 1772 with Joseph Banks, Uno von Troil and Daniel Solander where they were among the first to reach the summit of Hekla volcano, and Lind measured the height of Geysir in Haukadalur with a quadrant. 
 South Africa in 1779.  

The Icelandic expedition of 1772 took place after initial unsuccessful plans for both Banks and Lind to sail with James Cook on his second voyage as mentioned in A Voyage Round the World; Lind was to be hired as astronomer and to receive £4000 for the voyage. Consistent with the misidentification of the James Lind cousins, some sources credit the cousin James Lind (1716-1794) as the astronomer candidate for Cook's second voyage, however there is no doubt regarding the identity of James Lind (1736-1812) as noted in his son's memoirs A Sketch of My Life, and supported with the following excerpts from the Society minutes: Dr James Lind is recommended to the Board of Longitude ‘as a person who will be extremely useful in the intended voyage for discoveries in remote parts; on account of his skill and experience in his profession, and from his great Knowledge in Mineralogy, Chemistry, Mechanics, and various branches of Natural Philosophy; and also from his having spent several years in different climates, in the Indies'.-R.S., It was not really Cook but Joseph Banks who wanted Lind as part of his large entourage, and after Banks had failed to get his will with regards to the expedition ships of Cook's second voyage and decided not to go, they went to Iceland, the Hebrides and the Orkney Islands together instead in 1772.

Lind is likewise credited with first discovering the latitude of Islay, and developed a map of the island which was accepted by the geographical authority of era; Lind gave the map to Thomas Pennant. In reference to intellectual curiosity and government funding opportunities, Lind said, " [...] I am turned Longitude mad and I have go a most novel Sextant made by my friend Ramsden, which altho only Six inches Radius it is divided to half seconds. A magnifier magnifies the nonius and Telescope magnifies the Observation."

In 1774, Lind applied to professorship at Edinburgh competing against Andrew Duncan, William Buchan, Daniel Rutherford and others, but Lind was not selected for the position.

Lind invented the Lind Type Tube Anemometer (portable wind gauge) in 1775, a prototype of which he had sent to Sir John Pringle. Lind also designed a rain gauge as well as a barometer which he took to the summit of Arthur's Seat in collaboration with William Roy.

Military 
In 1776, Lind and Captain Alexander Blair developed the first rifled canon. It fired a special one pound led shot and was equipped with a telescopic sight. It was not successfully adopted, although the technologies described became widely used in future weapons.

Windsor 

Lind was elected a Fellow of the Royal Society of London 18 December 1777. Around the same time he seems to have settled at Windsor, where he later became physician to the royal household for King George III. Lind lived on Park Street, Mayfair and was a neighbor of Jean-André Deluc. 

Among miscellaneous tasks the King had assigned to Lind, in Jan 1782 Lind planted at cabbage garden intended to protect hares over winter. Lind also advised Joseph Banks, who was George III's adviser for the Royal Botanic Gardens, and Major William Price on agricultural projects such as growing mangelwurzel and lima beans.

Lind was interested in forensics. When the coffin of Edward IV was opened and remains examined at Windsor in 1789 or 1799, Lind made an analysis of the remains and liquid found in it, noting: "The appearance of this liquor was very much like that of walnut-pickle. A dark brown colour, which was rendered very dense by a quantity of matter, principally consisting of very small particles of a woody substance [...] It was inodorous and tasteless, excepting a small degree of roughness or astringency; just like water which has remains some time in a rotten wooden vessel".

Publishing 
While at Windsor, Lind also had a private press where he published numerous works including Sir Robert Douglas's Peerage of Scotland and The Genealogy of the Families of Lind and the Montgomeries of Smithson, as well as miscellaneous other books, pamphlets, and experimented with typography. Lind also wrote several mysterious encrypted books in characters regarded as "Lindian Ogham" which was suggested by Charles Knight (whose father was acquainted with Lind) to have been an encryption for Illuminati correspondence. Furthermore, Lind collected autographs and may have been interested in phantasmagoria.
Lind communicated extensively with Cavallo. For example, Lind communicated with Cavallo on the art of silhouette making and made silhouette portraits of George III, Queen Charlotte, and others using the 'Lind process'.

Scientific and medical experiments 
Lind suggested the use of electroshock therapy to treat insanity (particularly in the context of treating George III's mental illness) as he had extensively studied and experimented with galvanism, and communicated with Tiberius Cavallo on the subject. In one correspondence, Lind reported successful treatment of a condition similar to postpartum femoral neuropathy (leg paralysis after birth) using 'medical electricity'. Lind may have designed a primitive cardiopulmonary resuscitation machine to revive a patient. In a letter to James Watt, Lind references an electric machine that treats ophthalmia. Lind also believed "animal electricity" was a vital life force. 

Lind had also invented the "Thunder House" which repeated and verified Benjamin Franklin's lightening rod experiments, and he also attached a long rod to his chimney with a long chain connected to the ground, with a wire connected to the chain entering him room to charge electric Layden jars and also to make to bells ring. The relationship between Lind and Franklin is documented in letters to James Watt, as well as letters between David Hume and Franklin where Lind is referred to as Brother Lin. Lind also experimented with Franklin's sparking electrostatic machine to animate reptile muscles.

Lind constructed an earthquake machine (seismograph) which Hugh Davies Griffith of Chester inquired if Lind detected seismic activity after an 1801 earthquake. 

Lind also experimented with distillation. He conducted "Experiments upon the Waters at His Majesty's Dog-Kennel". 

In 1787, Lind experimented in treating inflammation and gastrointestinal disorders with mercury. He also invented a "plaster for the cure of White-Swelling" among other medical advancements. 

In a letter written in 1796 to Cavallo (originating from Windsor) and published in Cavallo's An Essay on the Medicinal Properties of Factitious Airs (1798), Lind recognized the therapeutic potential of carbon monoxide as hydrocarbonate for treating lung inflammation, the mechanism of which was recently elucidated in 2000 via the mitogen-activated protein kinase pathway and remains a focus of pharmaceutical development efforts. Lind's discovery for the beneficial effects of carbon monoxide to treat inflammation is regarded as a piece of historical irony since Lind is considered to be the inspiration of Dr. Frankenstein, yet, throughout the 1920s (due to widespread cases of carbon monoxide poisoning from civilization's expanding industrial activities, illuminating gas leaks, automobile exhaust exposure, etc.) several medical scientists condemned carbon monoxide as "Frankenstein's monster". Lind's discovery is a significant origin for the field of gasotransmitters in the context of carbon monoxide's neurotransmitter properties and pharmaceutical development of carbon monoxide therapeutics. In the same work, Lind designed a novel inhaler for delivery of hydrocarbonate therapeutic gas.

Inspired by Cavallo, Lind was also interested in ballooning and aerial flight in the late 1790s. Along these lines, in 1783 George III also sent Lind with Jean-André Deluc to Barnet to inspect a "Machine in the shape of a Bird, which was supposed to be capable of carrying a weight of 800 lbs. thro' the air".

Retirement 
Lind was a peripatetic natural philosophy tutor associated with Eton College while in semi-retirement in the early 1800s where he was acquainted with Shelley and introduced him to science and the writings of Plato, Voltaire, Franklin, Condorcet, Albertus Magnus, Paracelsus, and others.

Honors 

 1770 - elected fellow of Royal College of Physicians of Edinburgh
 1777 - elected fellow of the Royal Society (18 Dec 1777)
 1783 - elected fellow of the Royal Society of Edinburgh (03 Nov 1783)
 Appointed physician-in-ordinary to the Royal Household

Publications
1762 - Lind's inaugural dissertation, De Febre Remittente Putrida Paludum quæ grassabatur in Bengalia
1768 - dissertation published at Edinburgh.
1768 - An Essay on diseases incidental to Europeans in hot climates, with the method of preventing their fatal consequences.
1772 - Lind produced a translation of dissertation, Treatise on the Fever of 1762 at Bengal.
1769 - In three papers for the Royal Society, Lind discussed: the 1769 transit of Venus observed at Hawkhill, near Edinburgh; an eclipse of the moon, same place and year, with remarks by Nevil Maskelyne
1775 - portable wind gauge.
1776 - A description of rifled ordnance; Fitted with Sectors, Telescopes, &c. In which is contained, an Account of the Nature and Properties of rifles in general.
1787 - An Account of the Efficacy of Mercury in the Cure of Inflammatory Diseases, and the Dysentery.
1789 - A catalogue of such Chinese and Japanese plants whose Chinese characters are known and are botanically described.
1798 - A letter from Lind appears in Tiberius Cavallo's An Essay on the Medicinal Properties of Factitious Airs.
1800 - A Sketch for medical education, emphasized importance of mathematics
1803 - Copy of a Letter to the late Thomas Pennant of Downing on Typhus Fevers

Letters 
 "Unpublished Remains of Eminent Persons", p. 239-246, "Thirteen letters, never before published, from the late James Watt, esq. FRS, the celebrated Mechanician, to Dr. James Lind, FRS of Windsor." The Monthly Magazine, Volume 50, Part 2, 1820.
 "A Letter from Dr. James Lind to Mr. Cavallo", p. 475-476, 1784.
"A bag of gravel is a history to me", p.56, letter from James Hutton to James Lind, 1772
"a new machine to pump water", letter from George Dempster of Dunnichen to Lind, 1787
Miscellaneous letters between Lind and residents of Birmingham, such as John Carmichael of Birmingham General Hospital (who was formerly engaged to Anne Boulton), are stored in the archives of the Library of Birmingham

Miscellaneous 
 "The Real Shelley: New Views of the Poet's Life, Volume 1", alternative perspective on Lind's mischievous behavior and use of profanity,  p. 94-113.
"Proceedings of the Society of Antiquaries of Scotland, Volume 12", account disputing Lind's appointment as physician to George III, potentially case of mistaken identity with James Lind M.D. of Haslar, 1817,  p. 214
"James Lind, M.D., of Windsor", biography; clarifies distinction from James Lind M.D. of Haslar, p. 626-628.
Account suggesting Lind was injured by George III
"The Influence of James Lind MD, FRS on the Scientific and Philosophical Thought of Percy Bysshe Shelley and his circle" by Christopher Goulding (PhD thesis, University of Newcastle upon Tyne, 2002)""
"An old, old man with hair of silver white: a more scientific image of Shelley's mentor at Eton" by Christopher Goulding, Keats-Shelley Review 14.1 (2000) ""
"Shelley's Cosmological Sublime: William Herschel, James Lind and 'The Multitudinous Orb" by Christopher Goulding, Review of English Studies 57.232 (Nov 2006) ""

Notes

External links

jameslind.co.uk, site by Christopher Goulding
Lodge Canongate Kilwinning, No.2 
Grand Lodge of Scotland
James Lind Institute

1736 births
1812 deaths
18th-century Scottish medical doctors
British East India Company Marine personnel
Fellows of the Royal Society
Naval surgeons
Scottish Freemasons
Scottish surgeons